Jinseon Girls' High School is a private girls high school located in Gangnam-gu, Seoul, South Korea.

In 2008, it was selected as an excellent environmental education school. In 2009, the school was operated as a regular essay base school by the Seoul Metropolitan Office of Education with easy access and pleasant classroom environment. In addition, it was selected as an excellent school for the 2009 education evaluation curriculum.

The motto is "Be true and a good man". The symbol tree is bodhi tree and the symbol flower is lotus. It is composed of 32 classes in 3rd grade. Club activities include Buddhist student councils, girl scouts, theater departments, broadcasting classes, and chamber orchestra classes.

Notable alumni
Lee Se-eun (born 1980), South Korean actress
Jun Ji-hyun (born 1981), South Korean actress
Lee Ji-seon (born 1983),  South Korean fashion designer and Miss Korea in 2007
Hwang Bo-ra (born 1983), South Korean actress
Bang Min-ah (born 1993), South Korean singer and actress
Siyeon (born 1995), South Korean singer (Dreamcatcher)
Dami (born 1997), South Korean Rapper (Dreamcatcher)
Uchae (born 2002), South Korean singer Nature (group)

See also
Education in South Korea
Jinseon Girls' High School (Korean)
Jinseon Girls' High School Alumni (Korean)

References

External links
 

Education in South Korea
Educational organizations based in South Korea
Education in Seoul
High schools in South Korea
Girls' schools in South Korea